Sérignac may refer to the following places in France:

 Sérignac, Lot, a commune in the Lot department
 Sérignac, Tarn-et-Garonne, a commune in the Tarn-et-Garonne department